LaCorte is a surname. Notable people with the surname include:

Frank LaCorte (born 1951), American baseball player
Ken LaCorte (born 1965), American television executive